Verticordia fimbrilepis subsp. australis, commonly known as southern shy featherflower is a flowering plant in the myrtle family, Myrtaceae and is endemic to the south-west of Western Australia. It is a slender shrub with one openly branched main stem at its base, small, pointed leaves and rounded groups of pink flowers near the ends of the branches.

Description
Those near the flowers are more oblong to narrow egg-shaped.

The staminodes have a broad stalk and a hairy fringe, lacking the single long hair in their centre of subspecies fimbrilepis. Flowering time is from October to December.

Taxonomy and naming
Verticordia fimbrilepis was first formally described by Nikolai Turczaninow in 1847 and the description was published in the Bulletin de la Société Impériale des Naturalistes de Moscou. In 1991, Alex George undertook a review of the genus Verticordia and described two subspecies of V. fimbrilepis including this one. The type collection was made near the Kent River by George, Elizabeth George and Tony Annels in 1985. The epithet australis is from the Latin australis (southern) and refers to the distribution of this subspecies relative to that of subspecies fimbrilepis.

Distribution and habitat
This verticordia grows in clay-loam on granitic slopes in heath. It is only known from small areas near Denmark and Albany in the Warren and Jarrah Forest biogeographic regions.

Conservation
This subspecies of Verticordia fimbrilepis is classified "Threatened" by the Western Australian Government Department of Parks and Wildlife meaning that it is likely to become extinct or is rare, or otherwise in need of special protection. It is also classed as "Endangered" (VU) under the Australian Government Environment Protection and Biodiversity Conservation Act 1999 (EPBC Act).

Use in horticulture
This subspecies of V. fimbrilepis was first propagated from cuttings in 1991 and have been grown in raised beds and in pots since then. Although not spectacular in flower, the pink flowers are attractive. It does not appear to have been grown in eastern Australian states.

References

fimbrilepis
Rosids of Western Australia
Eudicots of Western Australia
Plants described in 1991
Plant subspecies
Endemic flora of Southwest Australia